Marto may refer to the following people:

 Given name
Marto Gracias (died 2016), Indian football player

 Surname
 António Marto (born 1947), Portuguese prelate
 Jacinta and Francisco Marto, (1908–1919, 1910–1920), Portuguese child visionaries, canonized as saints in 2017

See also 

 Martos (surname)